Sayella watlingsi is a species of minute sea snail, a marine gastropod mollusk in the family Pyramidellidae, the pyrams and their allies.

Description
The shell grows to a length of 3.4 mm.

Distribution
The type species was found off the Bahamas.

References

 Morrison, J. P. E. 1939. Two new species of Sayella with notes on the genus. Nautilus 53: 43-45

External links
 To Biodiversity Heritage Library (1 publication)
 To Encyclopedia of Life
 To World Register of Marine Species

Pyramidellidae
Gastropods described in 1939